The Coventry to Leamington Line is a railway line linking the city of Coventry with the town of Leamington Spa.  The line was opened in 1844 by the London and Birmingham Railway, as far as Milverton. The line was extended to Leamington Spa Avenue in 1851. A connecting line to  opened in 1884.

Late in the 19th century, most of the route was doubled to increase capacity. Only a small section just outside Kenilworth, at Gibbet Hill, remained single track. Most of the line was singled in 1972.

History
In 1839, an independent company the Warwick and Leamington Union Railway, under the chairmanship of Joseph Frederick Ledsam, submitted plans for a new line connecting Leamington with the London and Birmingham Railway (L&BR) at Coventry; the plans were approved by an Act of Parliament in 1842. The following year, before the line was built, the Warwick and Leamington Union Railway was purchased by the L&BR, which itself became part of the London and North Western Railway (LNWR) three years later.

The line was opened on 9 December 1844 from Coventry via  to the original terminus, at what was then known as Leamington station but later became known (after numerous name changes) as  Warwick (Milverton) station. The Milverton terminus was inconveniently located a mile from the centre of Leamington, as it had been intended as a compromise to serve both Leamington and Warwick, located midway between the two towns; this was considered unsatisfactory and so, in 1851, the line was extended closer to Leamington town centre and joined end-on to the LNWR's branch line to Rugby. A new, more centrally located station, Leamington Spa (Avenue), was opened on this extension in 1854; this was alongside the rival Great Western Railway (GWR) station at Leamington.

An accident occurred on the line on 11 June 1861, when a bridge collapsed between Leamington and Kenilworth as an empty goods train was passing over it, killing the train driver and fireman.

Originally built as a single track line, the route between Leamington and Kenilworth was widened to double track in 1884 and the stations at Milverton and Kenilworth were rebuilt; however, the section from Kenilworth Junction to Gibbet Hill Junction, just south of Coventry, remained single track. This line avoided Coventry and allowed the LNWR to introduce a direct Leamington to Birmingham service.

The line came under the management of the London, Midland and Scottish Railway (LMS) in 1923 and later British Railways in 1948. In the early 1960s, the line, along with the Leamington-Rugby line, was heavily used as a diversionary route while the West Coast Main Line was being electrified. However, the local passenger service was withdrawn on 18 January 1965, as a result of the Beeching Axe, and Kenilworth, Milverton and Avenue stations were closed. With Avenue station closed, a new connection was built the same year connecting the line to the former GWR Leamington station (previously only a siding had connected the former LNWR and GWR lines at Leamington). The Berkswell Loop was closed on 17 January 1969, after a freight train derailed, and the track was lifted the following year. In 1972, British Rail singled much of the line but retained some double track to form a passing loop at Kenilworth.

In May 1977, British Rail resumed passenger services over the line; this was largely due to the opening of  station between Birmingham and Coventry in 1976.

In August 2007, Network Rail reinstated  of double track at the northern end of the line from Park Junction (now removed) to Gibbet Hill Junction in order to increase capacity.

Kenilworth station re-opening
In 2013, funding was approved to rebuild and reopen Kenilworth railway station. The line was also scheduled to be re-doubled from Milverton Junction to Kenilworth and electrified as part of the Electric Spine project, although these plans were put on hold by Network Rail in 2016 and no date has since been given for completion of this work.

Construction of the new station at Kenilworth began in July 2016. The opening date was originally meant to be August 2017, although this was repeatedly postponed. It finally opened on 30 April 2018. The new hourly service operated by West Midlands Trains was initially a shuttle between Leamington Spa and Coventry, calling at Kenilworth. In December 2021 West Midlands Trains once again declared their failure to run services on the Coventry–Leamington line and the Coventry–Nuneaton line until at least the end of January 2022. This followed their failure in early 2021 to maintain a service.

The line today
Today, most of the line is single track which limits the number of services using it. What remains of double track includes a passing loop at Kenilworth, along with the lines out from Coventry and Leamington Spa to Gibbet Hill Junction and Milverton respectively.

In 2009, thirty such trains used the line daily.

Proposed development
In July 2019 Warwickshire County Council put forward proposals for six new stations in the county, one of these would be a new station on the Coventry–Leamington line, in between Coventry and Kenilworth which would serve south Coventry and the University of Warwick. If the plans go ahead this would happen between 2026 and 2033.

In April 2022, the bridge over Rugby Road in Leamington Spa will be replaced. The current bridge has a 20 mph speed limit due to its poor condition.

See also
Coventry to Nuneaton line
Leamington to Rugby line
Weedon-Leamington line
Coat of Arms Bridge

References

 
 
 

Railway lines in the West Midlands (region)
Railway lines opened in 1844
1844 establishments in England
Kenilworth
Leamington Spa
Rail transport in Coventry